Aatu Kujanpää (born 27 July 1998) is a Finnish professional footballer who plays as a midfielder for HIFK.

Career

Club career
He returned to SJK for the 2020 season. On 13 November he left the club.

On 8 March 2021, he signed a contract with HIFK for the 2021 season. The contract was extended for the 2022 season.

References

External links

1998 births
Living people
Finnish footballers
Seinäjoen Jalkapallokerho players
SJK Akatemia players
Vaasan Palloseura players
HIFK Fotboll players
Kakkonen players
Veikkausliiga players
Association football midfielders